Me Muero Porque Seas Mi Novia is the fifth studio album released by Los Bukis in 1980. It was later re-released as Mi Najayita. The group moved to the United States and signed with Fonovisa.

Track listing

All songs written and composed by Marco Antonio Solís except for Los Chicanos

References

1980 albums
Los Bukis albums